Sir James Dunn Collegiate and Vocational School (SJD, "The Dunn") was a high school located on Wellington St. in Sault Ste. Marie, Ontario. Sir James Dunn and Anna McCrea schools were created on the lands of the former Shingwauk Indian Residential School, during a period of Indigenous educational integration.

Recognitions
Sir James Dunn Collegiate & Vocational School was often recognized in its community for its leading music, arts, and athletics programs, having won many local sports championships and arts and music competitions. The school mascot, the Eagle, represents its many sports teams and clubs.

In Fall , SJD and Bawating Collegiate and Vocational School were combined at the SJD location for one year, to form the temporary new high school "Superior Heights". Then, in Fall 2011 a newer, larger school was opened on the old Bawating site, called Superior Heights Collegiate and Vocational School. The Sir James Dunn site was demolished in 2016. In 2022, the property is now a field, with little to no evidence of the SJD and it’s storied past. It is expected that as Algoma University continues to expand, this space will eventually become part of the university campus, which would be bordered by Wellington Street East on the north side of the property.

The 2016 film The Void was filmed in the Sault, specifically on location at the Dunn before its demise.

Activities
Dunnplugged was a concert performed by students in the school theatre during lunch hour. Performances range from bands to instrumentalists to acoustic performances. The Dunnplugged performance proceeds have allowed the school to record full CDs with original music written by students. Notable bands from Dunnplugged's past include The Chuck Herriman Experience The Tenagens, Fabio, Brain Tuel, Kalle Mattson, Cookies for Breakfast, Lankee, Caddy Street Avenue, Renderware, as well as the Kiss tribute band "Creatures of the Night."

Notable alumni
Dr. Roberta Bondar, the first Canadian female astronaut and the first neurologist in space
Wayne Gretzky, Canadian professional hockey player and coach
Treble Charger band, formed at Sir James Dunn by students Greig Nori, Bill Priddle, Rosie Martin, and Richard Mulligan

References

High schools in Sault Ste. Marie, Ontario
1957 establishments in Ontario
Educational institutions established in 1957
2010 disestablishments in Ontario
Educational institutions disestablished in 2010
Buildings and structures demolished in 2016
Demolished buildings and structures in Ontario